Panegyrtes fraternus is a species of beetle in the family Cerambycidae. It was described by Galileo and Martins in 1995. It is known from Brazil.

References
Digital resource at www.catalogueoflife.org/col.

Desmiphorini
Beetles described in 1995